The 1991 NBA All-Star Game was an exhibition basketball game between players selected from the National Basketball Association's Western Conference and the Eastern Conference that was played on February 10, 1991, at the Charlotte Coliseum in Charlotte, North Carolina. This game was the 41st edition of the NBA All-Star Game and was played during the 1990–91 NBA season.

The All-Star Weekend began on Saturday, February 9, 1991, with the Stay In School Jam, Legends Classic, the Three-Point Shootout and the Slam Dunk Contest.

This was the first NBA All-Star Game broadcast by NBC after 17 years with CBS.

The All-Star Game returned to Charlotte in 2019, though it was played at the Spectrum Center in Uptown, and broadcast on TNT (the All-Star Game has never been broadcast on ABC or ESPN during the networks' current contract with the league, which began during the 2002-03 season).

All-Star Game
The West could have won, but Kevin Johnson's potential game-winning three-pointer was nullified by a basket interference call on Karl Malone.

Rosters

Even though they were selected, Isiah Thomas and Larry Bird couldn't play due to injuries. Hersey Hawkins was selected as Bird's replacement, and no replacement was named for Thomas.
Eastern Conference head coach Chris Ford chose Joe Dumars and Bernard King to start in place of the injured Thomas and Bird.

All-Star Weekend

Legends Classic

The 8th edition of the Schick Legends Classic took place on February 9, 1991. It consisted of an exhibition match between retired players from the Eastern and Western Conference. The East Legends won 41–34.

Rosters

Slam Dunk Contest

The Gatorade Slam Dunk Contest had three of the previous year's contestants, with the notable absence of defending champion Dominique Wilkins. Dee Brown took home the trophy after defeating Shawn Kemp in the final, performing a dunk while covering his eyes with one arm. The scoring system consisted of the total of the two dunks, and in the final round the two best out of three dunks.

Three-Point Shootout
The American Airlines–ITT Sheraton Three-Point Shootout saw Craig Hodges repeat as champion, by defeating Portland's Terry Porter in the final round. Players begin shooting from one corner of the court, and move from station to station along the three-point arc until they reach the other corner. Each station has four standard balls, worth one point each, plus one specially colored "money ball", worth two points.

 Terry Porter and Tim Hardaway broke the tie in a 30-second shooting round.

References

National Basketball Association All-Star Game
All-Star
NBA All-Star
GMA Network television specials